Sylvia Rose (née Müller, born 23 December 1962 in Barth, East Germany) is a German rowing coxswain.

References 
 
 

1962 births
Living people
East German female rowers
Coxswains (rowing)
People from Barth, Germany
Rowers at the 1988 Summer Olympics
Olympic gold medalists for East Germany
Olympic rowers of East Germany
Olympic medalists in rowing
Medalists at the 1988 Summer Olympics
World Rowing Championships medalists for East Germany
Sportspeople from Mecklenburg-Western Pomerania